Alejandro Sirvent (born October 18, 1979), also credited as Alex Sirvent, is a Mexican actor, singer and composer.

His first TV series stint was playing the role of Eduardo Arellano Gómez in telenovela Corazones al límite. His filmography includes Bajo el mismo techo, Contra viento y marea, Vibe, Madre Luna and Para Volver a Amar. Some of his songs have gone on to be featured in some telenovelas. His duet with Ximena Herrera, Junto a Ti, was used as a theme song on the telenovela Abismo de Pasión. Another single, Cruzaré Mil Mares, was used as a theme song on Lo que la vida me robó.

Filmography

Discography 
 Lo mejor que me pasó en la vida (2013)

References

External links

1979 births
Mexican male telenovela actors
Male actors from Mexico City
Living people
Singers from Mexico City
21st-century Mexican singers